The Long Teeth (original title "Les Dents longues") is a French comedy drama film from 1953, directed by Daniel Gélin, written by Michel Audiard. It features Danièle Delorme, Louis de Funès, Roger Vadim and Brigitte Bardot. The story is based on Jacques Robert's novel "Les dents longues".

Cast 
 Danièle Delorme: Eva Commandeur (Louis Commandeur's wife)
 Daniel Gélin: Louis Commandeur (Eva's husband)
 Jean Chevrier: Mr Walter (editor-in-chief of "Paris-France")
 Louis Seigner: Antoine Josserand (director of weekly journal "Le Canut")
 Olivier Hussenot: André Maurienne (the legal correspondent) 
 Jean Debucourt: Mr Goudal (Mr Walter's close colleague)
 René Hiéronimus: Mr Renoir (Mr Walter's colleague)
 Colette Mars: Carmen (the party organiser)
 Louis de Funès: the employee in the photographic laboratory
 Gaby Bruyère: Maud (Mr Bruni's teacher)
 Louis Bugette: "Papa" (the press photographer)
 Robert Rollis: Bob (the barman in the dance hall)
 Joëlle Bernard: Raymonde Josserand (Antoine's wife)
 Roger Vadim: a witness to the marriage of Louis and Eva
 Brigitte Bardot: the wife of the aforementioned witness to a marriage
 Judith Magre: Mr Commandeur's secretary
 Yvette Etievant: Yvonne (Mr Walter's secretary)
 Christian Argentin: Mr Bruni (the suspicious politician)
 Paul Ville: Mr Bourdon (manager of "Le Canut")
 René Lacourt: the caretaker

References

External links 
 
 Les Dents longues (1952) at the Films de France

1952 films
1953 comedy-drama films
French comedy-drama films
1950s French-language films
French black-and-white films
Films set in Paris
Films with screenplays by Michel Audiard
1950s French films